Leif Edling (born 6 August 1963) is a Swedish musician, best known as the bassist, main songwriter and one of the founding members of the epic doom metal band Candlemass. He is the only constant member of the band since its inception to the present day. Nevertheless, since the band's second reunion in 2002 Edling has been backed up again by founding rhythm guitarist Mats Björkman, who had been absent from 1997 to 2002 and was replaced by Michael Amott.

Biography
Edling started his musical career in the band Trilogy, then under the name of Toxic, as a singer together with Ian Haugland (later the drummer of Europe) in 1979. He then played in a band named Witchcraft but left in 1981 and formed Nemesis in 1982. Before the Candlemass official releases, Edling also handled vocal duties in addition to playing bass.

After the departure of Messiah Marcolin, Candlemass became his solo project, until the band reformed in 2002. In 1994, when Candlemass fell apart, Leif had started the band Abstrakt Algebra with Mats Levén on vocals and Mike Wead on guitar.  The band met with limited success and disbanded after one album.

In 2002, he founded another doom metal band, named Krux, also with Mats Levén on vocals, and in 2013 founded Avatarium with Marcus Jidell on guitar and Jidell's wife, Jennie-Ann Smith on vocals.

Since early 2014, Edling had been unable to tour with either Candlemass or Avatarium due to unspecified health problems, though believed to be chronic fatigue syndrome. A variety of replacement members were used, including Grave/Entombed bassist Jörgen Sandström and keyboard player Per Wiberg switching to bass. He has returned to performing with the band as of 2019.

Discography

With Nemesis 
 The Day of Retribution −1984

With Candlemass 
 Epicus Doomicus Metallicus – 1986
 Nightfall – 1987
 Ancient Dreams – 1988
 Tales of Creation – 1989
 Live – 1990 (live)
 Chapter VI – 1992
 Dactylis Glomerata – 1998
 From the 13th Sun – 1999
 Doomed for Live – Reunion 2002 – 2003 (live double CD)
 Candlemass – 2005
 King of the Grey Islands – 2007
 20 Year Anniversary Party – 2007 (DVD)
 Lucifer Rising – 2008 (EP)
 Death Magic Doom – 2009
 Psalms for the Dead – 2012
 Death Thy Lover – 2016 (EP)
 House of Doom – 2018 (EP)
 The Door to Doom – 2019
 The Pendulum – 2020 (EP)

With Abstrakt Algebra 
 Abstrakt Algebra – 1994
 Abstrakt Algebra II – 2008

With Krux 
 Krux – 2003
 II – 2006
 III – He Who Sleeps Amongst the Stars – 2011

With Avatarium 
 Moonhorse – 2013 (12")
 Avatarium – 2013 (CD, double LP)
 All I Want – 2014 (12")
 The Girl with the Raven Mask – 2015 (CD, double LP)
 Hurricanes and Halos – 2017 (CD, double LP)

With The Doomsday Kingdom 
 The Doomsday Kingdom – 2017

Solo 
 Songs of Torment, Songs of Joy – 2008

References 

Swedish heavy metal bass guitarists
Living people
1963 births
Male bass guitarists
Krux members
Candlemass (band) members
Abstrakt Algebra members